Back-to-back filming is the practice of shooting two or more films as one production, thus reducing costs and time.

Trilogies are common in the film industry, particularly in the science fiction, fantasy, action, horror, thriller, and adventure genres. Production companies may choose, if the first film is a financial success, to green-light a second and a third film at the same time and film them back-to-back. In a case where a lengthy novel is split into multiple installments for its film adaptation, those installments will usually be filmed back-to-back.

Rationale
In modern filmmaking, employment is now project-based, transitory, and "based on a film not a firm."  Almost all participants in the industry are freelancers, who move easily from one project to the next and do not have much loyalty to any particular studio, as long as they get paid.

This differs from the old studio system, a form of mass production in which a studio owned all the means of production (that is, reusable physical assets like sound stages, costumes, sets, and props) and carried large numbers of cast and crew on its payroll under long-term contracts. Under the old system, "a producer had a commitment to make six to eight films per year with a fairly identifiable staff."  Under the new system which replaced it after 1955, filmmaking became a "short-term film-by-film arrangement" in which a producer is expected to assemble an entirely new cast and crew for each project, and rent the means of production from contractors only as needed.

The advantage of the current system is that film studios no longer have to bother either with paying people who are not involved in a current film production, or with green-lighting films very frequently so as to efficiently exploit sunk costs in their human resources.  Studios shifted from a emphasis on "speed in production" to "more cooperative pre-shooting planning."  But now, when they want a particular person for a film, that person may be unavailable because they are already committed to another film for another production company for that particular time slot. In turn, for every single film, studios (and ultimately their investors, shareholders, or backers) end up bearing massive transaction costs because they not only have to get the right person at the right price, but at the right time, and if they cannot get that person, they have to scramble to locate a satisfactory substitute.  All successful directors and producers have certain favorite cast and crew members whom they prefer to work with, but that is of no help to the studio if that perfect character actor, costume designer, or music composer is already fully booked.  Compared to the previous system, directors and stars spend a much "larger part of their time negotiating each new film deal." 

Therefore, if a film does well at the box office and appears to have established a winning formula with a particular cast, crew and storyline, one way to minimize these transaction costs on sequels is to reassemble as much of the team as soon as possible (before anyone dies, retires, or commits to other possible scheduling conflicts) and sign them to a single production that will be edited, released, and promoted as multiple films. 

Filming back-to-back also minimizes the problem of actors visibly aging between sequels which do not have significant time gaps written in between them.  James Cameron referred to this problem as the "Stranger Things effect"—where characters who are supposed to be in high school are played by actors who appear to be a decade older—in order to explain why he filmed the second, third, and part of the fourth sequels to Avatar back to back. 

The pioneer of modern back-to-back filmmaking was producer Alexander Salkind, who decided during the filming of The Three Musketeers (1973) to split the project in two; the second film was released as The Four Musketeers (1974).  The cast was quite unhappy to be informed after the fact they had been working on two films, not one.  As a result, the Screen Actors Guild introduced the "Salkind clause," which specifies that actors will be paid for each film they make.  Salkind and his son Ilya went on to produce Superman and Superman II back to back.

Examples
Superman and Superman II were filmed simultaneously in 1977 to be a two-part epic. However, due to off-screen difficulties between the producers and director Richard Donner, production on the sequel was stopped in order to finish the first film for a December 1978 release. Filming on Superman II resumed in 1979 with a new director (Richard Lester), and was released in Australia in December 1980 and in the UK and US in April and June 1981. A director's cut was released in  2006.
After the success of the 1985 film Back to the Future, the two sequels Part II and Part III were in production from February 1989 to January 1990 with only a three-week break in principal photography between films and some of the filming of the third film overlapping with the second. The two films were released six months apart, in November 1989 and May 1990 respectively.
The Lord of the Rings film series was filmed entirely over 438 days in New Zealand from October 1999 to December 2000 with pickup shots done prior to each film's theatrical release from 2001 to 2003. Likewise, The Hobbit film series was filmed back-to-back in New Zealand from March 2011 to July 2012.
The Matrix Reloaded and The Matrix Revolutions were filmed back-to-back from March 2001 to August 2002, and released six months apart, in May and November 2003 respectively.
Pirates of the Caribbean: Dead Man's Chest and Pirates of the Caribbean: At World's End were filmed back-to-back from February 2005 to January 2007, and released ten months apart, in July 2006 and May 2007 respectively.
Harry Potter and the Deathly Hallows – Part 1 and Harry Potter and the Deathly Hallows – Part 2 were filmed back-to-back from February 2009 to June 2010, with reshoots for the epilogue scene taking place in December 2010, and released eight months apart, in November 2010 and July 2011 respectively.
The Twilight Saga: Breaking Dawn – Part 1 and The Twilight Saga: Breaking Dawn – Part 2 were filmed back-to-back from November 2010 to April 2011, and released a year apart, in November 2011 and November 2012 respectively.
The Hunger Games: Mockingjay – Part 1 and The Hunger Games: Mockingjay – Part 2 were filmed back-to-back from September 2013 to June 2014, and released a year apart, in November 2014 and November 2015 respectively.
Fifty Shades Darker and Fifty Shades Freed were filmed back-to-back from February to July 2016, and released a year apart, in February 2017 and February 2018 respectively.
Avengers: Infinity War and Avengers: Endgame were filmed back-to-back from January 2017 to January 2018, with reshoots for Endgame concluding in October 2018, and released a year apart, in April 2018 and April 2019 respectively.
Avatar: The Way of Water and Avatar 3 (titles may change) were filmed back-to-back from 2017 to 2020. They are scheduled for release in 2022 and 2024. Back-to-back filming is also planned for Avatar 4 (2026) and Avatar 5 (2028).
Fast X and Fast X: Part 2 were filmed back-to-back from 2022 to 2023. They are scheduled for release in 2023 and 2024.
Mission: Impossible – Dead Reckoning Part One and Mission: Impossible – Dead Reckoning Part Two were filmed back-to-back from 2020 to 2022. They are scheduled for release in 2023 and 2024.
X and Pearl were filmed back-to-back in 2021, and released six months apart, in March and September 2022 respectively.

See also
List of films produced back-to-back
List of films split into multiple parts

References 

Film and video terminology